The 1996 Polish Speedway season was the 1996 season of motorcycle speedway in Poland.

Individual

Polish Individual Speedway Championship
The 1996 Individual Speedway Polish Championship final was held on 15 August at Warsaw. Sławomir Drabik won the Polish title for the second time and five years after his first triumph in 1991.

Golden Helmet
The 1996 Golden Golden Helmet organised by the Polish Motor Union (PZM) was the 1996 event for the league's leading riders. The final was held at Wrocław on the 27 September. Jacek Gollob won the Golden Helmet title and defeated his brother Tomasz Gollob in a final run off after they both finished on 14 points.

Junior Championship
 winner - Tomasz Bajerski

Silver Helmet
 winner - Wiesław Jaguś

Bronze Helmet
 winner - Damian Baliński

Pairs

Polish Pairs Speedway Championship
The 1996 Polish Pairs Speedway Championship was the 1996 edition of the Polish Pairs Speedway Championship. The final was held on 23 May at Gniezno.

Team

Team Speedway Polish Championship
The 1996 Team Speedway Polish Championship was the 1996 edition of the Team Polish Championship. Włókniarz Częstochowa won the gold medal, which was their first Championship gold since 1974. The team included Joe Screen, Sławomir Drabik and Sebastian Ułamek.

First Division

Play offs

Second Division

References

Poland Individual
Poland Team
Speedway
1996 in Polish speedway